Lucian Pintilie (9 November 1933 – 16 May 2018) was a Romanian theatre, film, and opera director, as well as screenwriter. His career in theatre, opera, film and television has gained him international recognition.

Early life
Pintilie was born in 1933 in Tarutina, at the time in Cetatea Albă County, Kingdom of Romania.

Theatre

Romania
From 1960 to 1972, Pintilie was resident director at the Bulandra Theatre in Bucharest, Romania. His productions there included George Bernard Shaw's Cesar and Cleopatra, Lorraine Hansberry's A Place in the Sun, William Saroyan's My Heart's in the Highlands, Max Frisch's Biedermann and the Firebugs, Nikolai Gogol's Inspector General and Anton Chekhov's Cherry Orchard. He also directed the Romanian classic comedy Carnival Scenes by Ion Luca Caragiale, which won the 1967 Prize for the best direction and best production at the National festival of theatre in Romania.

France
From 1973 to 1982, he directed mainly in France at the Théâtre national de Chaillot and the Théâtre de la Ville where he staged, among other plays, Carlo Gozzi's Turandot, Henrik Ibsen's Wild Duck, and Anton Chekhov's Three Sisters and Seagull.

US
In the United States, in addition to his work at the Guthrie Theater in Minneapolis, Pintilie staged Tartuffe and The Wild Duck at Arena Stage.

Opera
In France, he also directed several operas including a production of Oresteia by Aurel Stroe, based on the Greek tragedy, at the Festival in Avignon and Mozart's Magic Flute at the Festival in Aix-en-Provence. He also directed Bizet's Carmen for the Welsh National Opera of Cardiff, Wales.

Films (selection)
His films brought him international reputation.

Sunday at Six o Clock won the Prize of the Jury at the International film festival in Mar del Plata, Argentina in 1966, and the Grand Prize of the Jury at the International Encounter of Films for Youth at Cannes, France, in 1967.

In 1968, he directed The Reenactment, considered by film historians to be the most important representation of Romanian cinema.

In 1975, he filmed for Yugoslavian television Ward Six, his own adaptation of Chekhov's famous story. It won the Catholic Film Office Prize at the Cannes film festival.

Filmography
 Sunday at Six o Clock (Duminică la ora şase; 1965; director)
 The Reenactment (Reconstituirea; 1968; screenwriter and director)
 Ward Six (Paviljon VI; 1978; director)
 Carnival Scenes (De ce trag clopotele, Mitică?; 1982; screenwriter and director) - see also the "Portrayals and tributes" section at Mitică
 The Oak (Balanţa; 1992; screenwriter, producer and director)
 An Unforgettable Summer (1994; screenwriter and director)
 Too Late (Prea târziu; 1996; screenwriter and director)
 Next Stop Paradise (Terminus Paradis; 1998; screenwriter and director)
 The Afternoon of a Torturer (2001; screenwriter and director)
 Niki and Flo (2003; director)
 Tertium non datur (2006; screenwriter and director). For title meaning see Law of excluded middle.

References

External links
 

1933 births
2018 deaths
People from Odesa Oblast
Romanian film directors
Romanian screenwriters
Romanian theatre directors
Grand Officers of the Order of the Star of Romania